Blabia bicuspis is a species of beetle in the family Cerambycidae. It was described by Henry Walter Bates in 1866. It is known from Colombia, Brazil, Peru and Ecuador.

References

Blabia
Beetles described in 1866